Rapa Nui is the native name for Easter Island.

Rapa Nui may also refer to:
 Rapa Nui language, the indigenous language of Easter Island
 Rapa Nui mythology, the mythology of the indigenous inhabitants of Easter Island
 Rapa Nui people, the native Polynesian inhabitants of Easter Island
 Rapa Nui National Park the Chilean National Park which incorporates most of Easter Island
 Rapa-Nui (film), 1994
 Rapanui Rock, also known as Shag Rock, a sea stack near Sumner, New Zealand
 CF Rapa Nui, a Chilean association football team representing Easter Island